Ctenocheloides is a genus of ghost shrimp in the family Callianassidae, containing the single species Ctenocheloides attenboroughi. It was described in 2010, and named in honour of the British natural history broadcaster Sir David Attenborough. It is known from a single female specimen collected in shallow water on the north-western coast of Madagascar.

Description
The genus Ctenocheloides is known from a single female specimen. Ctenocheloides resembles the genus Ctenocheles, as reflected in the name of the genus, both genera having pectinate (comb-like) fingers to the chelae (claws). Ctenocheloides differs from Ctenocheles in having no rostrum, having well-developed eyes, and in having shorter, fatter claws.

Distribution
The single known specimen of Ctenocheloides was collected in 2008 from a "large, mud-cemented piece of rubble", dredged from a bay near Hell-Ville, Nosy Bé, in north-western Madagascar.

Taxonomy
Both the genus Ctenocheloides and its single species, C. attenboroughi were described in 2010 by Arthur Anker, in a paper in the Journal of Natural History. The genus name reflects the close relationship of the genus to Ctenocheles, while the specific epithet "attenboroughi" commemorates the British natural history broadcaster David Attenborough. It was originally placed in the family Ctenochelidae, which was later reduced to a subfamily of a broader Callianassidae.

See also
 List of things named after David Attenborough and his works

References

Thalassinidea
Monotypic decapod genera
Endemic fauna of Madagascar
Taxa named by Arthur Anker
Crustaceans described in 2010
Crustaceans of Africa
David Attenborough
Species known from a single specimen